It's So Hard to Tell Who's Going to Love You the Best is the debut album by American folk blues musician Karen Dalton, originally released in 1969 by Capitol Records (see 1969 in music).

The album was subsequently reissued on CD by the Koch label in 1997. Extended liner notes were written by Peter Stampfel of the Holy Modal Rounders, who writes:

In 1999, Megaphone issued the album again, this time with new packaging, a new booklet and a DVD with archival footage.

In 2009, Light In The Attic Records, once again, reissued the album on vinyl with new packaging and liner notes.

Track listing
"Little Bit of Rain" (Fred Neil) – 2:30
"Sweet Substitute" (Jelly Roll Morton) – 2:40
"Ribbon Bow" (Traditional; adapted by Karen Dalton) – 2:55
"I Love You More Than Words Can Say" (Eddie Floyd, Booker T. Jones) – 3:30
"In the Evening (It's So Hard to Tell Who's Going to Love You the Best)" (Leroy Carr) – 4:29
"Blues on the Ceiling" (Fred Neil) – 3:30
"It Hurts Me Too" (Mel London) – 3:05
"How Did the Feeling Feel to You" (Tim Hardin) – 2:52
"Right, Wrong or Ready" (Major Wiley) – 2:58
"Down on the Street (Don't You Follow Me Down)" (Lead Belly) – 2:17

Personnel
Karen Dalton - 12-string guitar, banjo, vocals
Kim King - electric guitar
Dan Hankin - acoustic guitar
Harvey Brooks - bass
Gary Chester - percussion
Technical
Lillian Douma, Sandy Fisher - engineers
Joel Brodsky - photography

References

Karen Dalton (singer) albums
1969 debut albums
Capitol Records albums
E1 Music albums
Albums produced by Nick Venet
Albums with cover art by Joel Brodsky